This is a list of Pashto-language television channels in Afghanistan, Pakistan, and other parts of world.

Afghanistan

 Ashna TV (Voice of America)
 Gharghasht TV
 khyber news
 khyber watch
 Hewad TV
 Lemar TV 
 Pashto TV
 RTA
 Saba TV
 Sandare TV
 Shamshad TV
 Watan TV 
 Zhwandoon TV
 Pashtun Tv
 Sharq TV
 Wakht TV
 Kabul News TV
 BBC Pashto TV
 One TV

Pakistan

 AVT Khyber
 Khyber News
 Aruj TV
 Paigham TV
 Pashto 1
 PTV Peshawar (Established 1974)
 Haditv Pashto
 Mashriq TV
 Atal HD TV

References

Television
Pashto mass media